Events in the year 1737 in Norway.

Incumbents
Monarch: Christian VI

Events

Arts and literature

Births
21 February – Christen Heiberg, civil servant, County Governor of Finnmark (d. 1801).
22 April – Reier Gjellebøl, priest and writer (died 1803).
28 May – Mathia Collett, merchant and businessperson (died 1801).

Deaths
19 May – Niels Knagenhielm, civil servant, land owner and non-fiction writer (born 1661).

See also

References